Norman Palmer may refer to:

Norman R. Palmer (1918–2013), American film editor
Norman Palmer (bishop) (1928–2008), Solomon Islands
Norm Palmer, see 1979 NASCAR Winston Cup Series

See also
A. Norman Palmer (1860–1927), American innovator in field of penmanship
Palmer (surname)